Rahim Beyglui-ye Sofla (also Romanized as Raḩīm Beyglūī-ye Soflá); also known as Raḩīm Beyglū-ye Pā’īn is a village in Arshaq-e Markazi Rural District of Arshaq District of Meshgin Shahr County, Ardabil province, Iran. At the 2006 census, its population was 378 in 80 households. The following census in 2011 counted 386 people in 98 households. The latest census in 2016 showed a population of 376 people in 107 households; it was the largest village in its rural district.

References 

Meshgin Shahr County

Towns and villages in Meshgin Shahr County

Populated places in Ardabil Province

Populated places in Meshgin Shahr County